The Tomahawk School District serves the city of Tomahawk, Wisconsin.  The present superintendent is Terry Reynolds
.

History
The first school (a kindergarten) opened in Tomahawk in 1888, while the first high school, Whittier High School, did not open until 1894. In 2000 the Tomahawk society members converted the first Tomahawk School into a museum holding many different historic items from the town's history.

Schools 
Tomahawk School District comprises three public schools:
 Tomahawk Elementary School.
 Tomahawk Middle School

Spirit 
All schools in the district compete athletically under the name "The Tomahawk Hatchets".  The school colors are blue and gold.

References 

School districts in Wisconsin
Education in Lincoln County, Wisconsin